Our Glamorous Time is a 2018 Chinese television series based on the novel of the same name by Ding Mo; starring Zhao Liying and Jin Han. It is set to air on Dragon TV and Zhejiang TV starting November 12, 2018.

This series has a 5.5 rating on Douban.

Synopsis
The drama will revolve around the romance between young white-collar worker Lin Qian and former military officer turned CEO Li Zhicheng. Lin Qian has the brains and the enthusiasm, but has been unsuccessful in all her ventures so far. Li Zhicheng’s family business is on the verge of bankruptcy, and he returns to the corporate world in an effort to reverse the situation. Lin Qian ends up helping Li Zhicheng revive the company, and they fall in love with each other in the process.

Cast

 Zhao Liying as Lin Qian
 A white collar worker who becomes the assistant of Aida Group president.
 Jin Han as Li Zhicheng
 President of Aida Group.
 Cao Xiwen as Zhu Hanqian (Grace)
 Head editor of "H" magazine.
 Yu Haoming as Gu Yanzhi
 Zhu Hanqian's nephew who is an overseas returnee. Li Zhicheng's close friend.
 Meng Rui as Chen Zheng
 CEO of Simeiqi Group.
 Johnny Zhang as Ning Weikai
 CEO of Baorui Group.
 Zhou Yiwei as Lin Mochen
 Lin Qian’s elder brother. Vice President of DP group. A man who possesses high IQ and EQ, and he is resolute and decisive in work; but is gentle and caring toward family and friends.
 Lin Yuan as Chen Yayi
 Lin Qian's close friend who is innocent and gentle. Chen Zheng's love interest.
 Liu Fanfei as Li Jinyuan
 Li Zhicheng's younger sister who is intelligent and eloquent. She comes between Chen Zheng and Chen Yayi's relationship.
 Hawick Lau as Li Zhiqian
 Previous CEO of Aida Group. Li Zhicheng's elder brother.
 Chang Chen-kuang as Li Zhongming
 Founder of Aida Group. Father of Li Zhicheng, Li Jinyuan and Li Zhiqian.
 Wen Yuqi as Cheng Meizi
 Li Yun'ao as Hui Xiong
 A special forces soldier. Li Zhicheng's former comrade.

Production
The series began filming at Wuhan on July 4, 2017 and wrapped up production on November 1, 2017.

The production team invited Su Mang to act as the fashion/trends director of the series.

Soundtrack

Ratings 

 Highest ratings are marked in red, lowest ratings are marked in blue

Awards and nominations

References

External links
 

Chinese romance television series
2018 Chinese television series debuts
Television shows based on works by Ding Mo
2018 Chinese television series endings